Jarava ichu, commonly known as Peruvian feathergrass, ichhu, paja brava, paja ichu, or simply ichu (Quechua for straw), is a grass species in the family Poaceae native to the Americas. It is found growing in a vast area: Mexico, Guatemala, Costa Rica, El Salvador, Venezuela, Bolivia, Colombia, Ecuador, Peru, Chile, and Argentina. It is a common grass of the Andean altiplano. It is used as fodder for livestock.

Under the synonym Stipa ichu, it has won the Royal Horticultural Society's Award of Garden Merit.

References

External links

Pooideae
Bunchgrasses of North America
Bunchgrasses of South America
Fodder
Flora of Central America
Flora of northern South America
Flora of southern South America
Flora of western South America
Flora of the Andes
Flora of Argentina
Flora of Bolivia
Flora of Chile
Flora of Peru
Plants described in 1798